Ye Shaoweng (fl. 1200–1250) was a Southern Song dynasty Chinese poet from Longquan, in modern Lishui, Zhejiang province. He belonged to the Jianghu (Rivers and Lakes) School of poets, known for its unadorned style of poetry. He was an academician serving in the imperial archives in the capital Hangzhou, and authored a history on the reigns of the first four emperors of the Southern Song entitled Sichao Jianwen Lu (四朝見聞錄), covering the period of  1127–1224. He was a friend of the Neo-Confucian scholar Zhen Dexiu. Little else is known about his life.

Poetry
Ye Shaoweng's most famous poem is Youyuan Buzhi (Visiting a Private Garden without Success):

遊園不值Visiting a Private Garden without Success

應憐屐齒印蒼苔It must be because he hates clogs on his moss
十扣柴扉久不開I knock ten times still his gate stayed closed
春色滿園關不住but spring can't be kept locked in a garden
一支紅杏出牆來a branch of red blossoms reached past the wall

The last couplet is often reused in later works, its meaning recast as a sexual innuendo. The African-American author Richard Wright wrote two haikus which bear close resemblance to Ye's poem.

References

Bibliography

Song dynasty poets
13th-century Chinese poets
Song dynasty historians
13th-century Chinese historians
Writers from Lishui
Poets from Zhejiang
Historians from Zhejiang